Vladislav Andreyevich Zolotaryov (De-Kastri, September 13, 1942 – Moscow, May 13, 1975) was a Soviet composer and bayanist. He is regarded as one of the greatest Soviet composers for bayan.

He graduated from the class of N. A. Lesnoi (bayan) at the Magadan Secondary School of Music in 1968, and studied composition under the guidance of R. K. Shchedrin (by way of consultation, 1968–1969), and with T. N. Khrennikov (at the Moscow Conservatoire, 1971–1972). He composed large-scale and chamber compositions, string quartets and vocal music, but is best known for his works for bayan (button accordion).

Friedrich Lips and A. Surkov wrote in Anthology of Compositions for Button Accordion: "The creative work of Vl. Zolotaryov can be described as a milestone of the utmost importance for the incontestable progress of accordion music. . . . In his Partita (1968), Six Children's Suites (1969/74), his Sonata N° 2 (1971) and Sonata No. 3 (1972), and Five Compositions (1971), the advantages of the new-type [converter free-bass] accordion have, as never before, been wholly revealed. The instrument has become a full and equal participant in the chamber sphere of art music."

Zolotaryov committed suicide at age 32.

References

External links
  Biography of Vladislav Zolotarev. By Inna Klause. Translated by David Sherman.
 Zolotaryov Vladislav (1942 - 1975)
 Two Posters for One Concert (It seems like yesterday, Part 2).  Accordion World, January 2002.

1942 births
1975 suicides
People from Khabarovsk Krai
20th-century composers
Russian accordionists
Soviet male composers
20th-century classical musicians
20th-century accordionists
20th-century Russian male musicians
Suicides in the Soviet Union